Szőnyi úti Stadion is a sports stadium in Zugló, Budapest, Hungary. The stadium is home to the association football side BVSC Budapest. The stadium has a capacity of 12,000.

History
On 2 April 2015, three new artificial pitches were inaugurated at the sports centre of the club. One of the pitches is 40 x 60 metres and the two other pitches are 22 x 40 metres in size. The cost of the construction of the new pitches was 150 million Hungarian forints. The investment was financed by the Hungarian Football Federation (70%) and by the Zugló Local Government.

Attendance

Records
Record Attendance:
 12,000 BVSC Budapest v Újpest FC, September 1994.

References

External links 
Magyarfutball.hu 

Football venues in Hungary